The 1996 Advanta Championships of Philadelphia was a women's tennis tournament played on indoor carpet courts at the Philadelphia Civic Center in Philadelphia, Pennsylvania in the United States that was part of Tier II of the 1996 WTA Tour. It was the 14th edition of the tournament and was held from November 11 through November 17, 1996.

Finals

Singles

 Jana Novotná defeated  Steffi Graf 6–4 (Graf retired)
 It was Novotná's 10th title of the year and the 76th of her career.

Doubles

 Lisa Raymond /  Rennae Stubbs defeated  Nicole Arendt /  Lori McNeil 6–4, 3–6, 6–3
 It was Raymond's 4th title of the year and the 7th of her career. It was Stubbs' 2nd title of the year and the 11th of her career.

References

External links
 ITF tournament edition details

Advanta Championships of Philadelphia
Advanta Championships of Philadelphia
Advanta Championships of Philadelphia
Advanta Championships of Philadelphia
Advanta Championships of Philadelphia